La Chepona Airport  is an airstrip serving the village of La Chepona in Usulután Department, El Salvador. The airstrip and village are on an estuarian island just east of the Jiquilisco Bay.

See also

Transport in El Salvador
List of airports in El Salvador

References

External links
 OpenStreetMap - La Chepona
 HERE/Nokia - La Chepona
 FallingRain - La Chepona Airport

Airports in El Salvador
Usulután Department